New Worlds is a 2014 Channel 4 TV series, set in 1680s England and America and forming a sequel to The Devil's Whore.

Production
In August 2013 Channel 4 announced a follow up series to The Devil's Whore. Written by Peter Flannery and Martine Brant, it follows Angelica (the central character from the previous series), now Countess of Abingdon, trying to protect her daughter, in an England still full of unrest and Hope and Ned, struggling in colonial Massachusetts. It is produced by Company Pictures with Johann Knobel serving as the producer. The executive producers are Peter Flannery, Martine Brant and John Yorke. Channel 4 started airing the series as one-hour episodes on 1 April 2014.

Cast
 Pip Carter – Judge Jeffreys
 Phil Cheadle – Ralph
 Holli Dempsey – Agnes
 Joe Dempsie – Ned
 Jamie Dornan – Abe Goffe
 Alice Englert – Hope
 Patrick Malahide – John Francis
 Michael Maloney – Hardwick
 Freya Mavor – Beth Fanshawe
 Eve Best – Angelica Fanshawe
 Jeremy Northam – Charles II
 Guy Henry – Randolph
 Amy Marston – Martha Hawkins
 Michael McElhatton – John Hawkins
 Tom Payne – Monmouth
 Elliot Reeve – Caleb Cresswell
 Malcolm Storry – Adam
 Tommy Hatto – Native American
 James Mcardle  – Will Blood
 Lewis C. Elson - Nobleman

References

External links
 

2014 British television series debuts
2014 British television series endings
2010s British drama television series
2010s British television miniseries
Television series set in the 17th century
Television series about the history of the United States
Channel 4 original programming
Channel 4 television dramas
Television series by All3Media
English-language television shows
Television shows set in Gloucestershire
Cultural depictions of Charles II of England